Sporus of Nicaea (c. 240 – c. 300) was a Greek mathematician and astronomer, probably from Nicaea, ancient district Bithynia (modern-day Iznik) in province Bursa, in modern-day Turkey.

Much of his work focused on squaring the circle and reproducing cubes, both in his own attempts at these problems or in criticizing the work of other contemporary mathematicians. Sporus criticized Archimedes for not producing a more accurate approximation of π.

References 

240 births
300 deaths
Ancient Greek astronomers
Ancient Greek mathematicians
People from Nicaea
3rd-century mathematicians
3rd-century astronomers